The Israel Airports Authority (IAA, Reshut Sdot HaTe'ufa BeYisra'el) was founded in 1977 as a public corporation mandated by the Israel Airports Authority Law. The authority is responsible for the management of Israel's major civil airports and land-to-land border terminals between Israel and its neighbours (Egypt, Jordan, and the Palestinian Authority). The authority's head office is on the grounds of Ben Gurion International Airport. As of 2015, the authority is headed by Eli Marom.

Facilities

Airports
 Ben Gurion Airport
 Ramon Airport
 Haifa Airport
 Herzliya Airport
 Rosh Pina Airport

Border terminals

Egypt
 Kerem Shalom border crossing
 Nitzana Border Crossing
 Taba Border Crossing

Jordan
 Allenby Bridge
 Jordan River Crossing
 Yitzhak Rabin Crossing (aka Wadi Araba Crossing)

References

External links

Official
  Israel Airports Authority Official Website
  Israel Airports Authority Official Website
  Israel Airports Authority Official Website

Airport operators
Airports Authority
Airports Authority
1977 establishments in Israel
Air navigation service providers